I pompieri is a 1985 Italian comedy film directed by Neri Parenti.

A sequel entitled Missione eroica – I pompieri 2 was released in 1987.

Cast
Paolo Villaggio as Paolo Casalotti
Lino Banfi as Nicola Ruoppolo
Massimo Boldi as Max Pirovano
Christian De Sica as Alberto Spina
Andrea Roncato as Armando Bigotti
Ricky Tognazzi as Daniele Traversi
Gigi Sammarchi as Commander Pacini
Paola Onofri as Cristina
Claudio Boldi as Tom
Paola Tiziana Cruciani as Signora Casalotti
Moana Pozzi as Amalia Ruoppolo

References

External links

1985 films
Films directed by Neri Parenti
Films scored by Bruno Zambrini
1980s Italian-language films
1985 comedy films
Italian comedy films
1980s Italian films